Motherwell Football Club is a Scottish professional football club based in Motherwell, North Lanarkshire, which plays in the Scottish Premiership. Motherwell have not dropped out of the top-flight of Scottish football since 1985, and have lifted one trophy in that time – the Scottish Cup in 1991.

Clad in their traditional claret and amber, Motherwell play their home matches at Fir Park Stadium and have done since 1896. The club's main rivals over the years have been Hamilton Academical and Airdrieonians, due in part to their close geographical proximities. These matches are known as the Lanarkshire derby.

The club have won four major trophies in domestic football: the Scottish League title in 1931–32, the Scottish Cup in 1951–52 and 1990–91, and the Scottish League Cup in 1950–51.

Sports Illustrated has suggested Motherwell F.C.'s fans as the originators of the "Viking Thunder Clap", a supporting chant eventually popularized by the fans of the Iceland national football team where fans stay silent and let out loud synchronized claps seconds apart, gradually speeding up; the chant received wider international attention during the Euro 2016.

History

Beginnings
Motherwell FC was born on 17 May 1886, when representatives of the two main Motherwell works teams Glencairn FC and Alpha FC met in Ballie's pub in the town's Merry Street, and decided to merge the two teams with the aim of creating a club to represent the town as a whole at a higher footballing level. Motherwell's debut fixture proved to be a successful one as they overcame Hamilton Academical 3–2.

The early years proved somewhat chaotic as the club had little regular competition to play in, and matches would often start with players short, as men failed to turn up on time after their shifts in the local ironworks. On 5 August 1893 the decision was made to turn professional, and the club was consequently elected to the league, then being the only Lanarkshire side to compete at national level.

Up until 1895 the club had played at a few different venues, including a site at Roman Road, and Dalziel Park. The small pitch and muddy conditions at Dalziel Park were deemed unsuitable and Lord Hamilton granted a lease on a plot of land on his Dalzell estate. This new ground was named Fir Park and has remained the club's home for over 120 years.

The following years saw the club grow, appointing their first and longest serving manager to date, John 'Sailor' Hunter, who would go on to steer the club into its most successful period.

In 1913 the decision was made to change the club's colours from blue to the now signature claret and amber. It is thought this was inspired by the success of Bradford City, who also sport claret and amber, although a more romantic version of events claims them to have been Lord Hamilton of Dalzell's racing colours.

1920s and 1930s successes

Motherwell enjoyed a successful period in the aftermath of World War I, managed by John Hunter. The club placed third in the 1919–20 season and, although narrowly avoiding relegation in 1924–25, they steadily climbed the table and enjoyed seven successive seasons finishing in the top three.

In the summer of 1927, the club made a very successful tour of Spain, winning six out of the eight games they played and losing only one. These results included an emphatic 3–1 victory over Real Madrid and a 2–2 draw with Barcelona. Following their success in Spain, the club went on another summer tour, this time of South America. After losing only three of their previous ten games, the tour culminated in a 5–0 defeat by a Brazilian League Select side.

Motherwell's first (and to this day, only) Scottish League championship came in 1931–32 – with 30 wins in 38 fixtures, scoring 119 goals – a record 52 of which were scored by Willie MacFadyen, who remains to this day the record holder for most goals scored in a single season and one of the club's all-time top goalscorers with 251 goals. The championship was sealed on 23 April 1932, when Rangers could only draw at home against Clyde, handing Motherwell the title without kicking a ball. This was also the only League title won by a club outside the Old Firm between 1904 and 1947. In the two seasons following the league title win (1933–34 and 1934–35), 'Well finished runners-up, as they had also been in 1926–27 and 1929–30. They also contested three Scottish Cup finals in this period – in 1931, 1933 and 1939, but lost them all.

Post-World War II period

Following the break-up of the squad after World War II, the club were not instantly successful. It then captured two major trophies in as many years with victories in the 1950 Scottish League Cup Final and the 1952 Scottish Cup Final. The club was then relegated for the first time ever at the end of the 1952–53 season, but the club were promoted the next year.

Following their return to the First Division, Bobby Ancell took management of the club in 1955 and presided over an era in which highly regarded Scotland stars including Ian St. John and Charlie Aitken played for the club. However, Motherwell were unable to keep their assets, and no trophies were won in Ancell's era. His resignation came in 1965 amidst a downturn in form which eventually saw the club relegated back to the Second Division at the conclusion of the 1967–68 season.

1970s recovery and the McLean era

Motherwell were immediately promoted back to the First Division in 1969, maintaining a mid-table position. The 18-team First Division was superseded by a new 10-team Premier League for the 1975–76 season, at which time they were managed by Willie McLean and his assistant Craig Brown (who would become manager almost 35 years later). Under their management, Motherwell improved to fourth in the table with players such as Bobby Graham, Willie Pettigrew and Bobby Watson. The most notable cup run of that period was the 1975-76 Scottish Cup where they eliminated Celtic and lost out in the semi-final to Rangers.

1980 and 90s

Relegation down to the now-First Division and promotion back to the Premier League occurred twice in the early 1980s, before a decade under manager Tommy McLean (brother of Willie) culminated in a Scottish Cup win in 1991. However, similarly to the Ancell era, Scotland internationalist Tom Boyd was sold in the close season after the cup win. Results faded for two years before reaching another two season zenith immediately following the signing of Paul Lambert with third (1993–94) and second-placed (1994–95) Premier League finishes. The 1995 runners-up finish was the club's highest finish since 1933–34.

With Tommy McLean's departure to Hearts in 1994, much of his squad was broken up; a large fee in particular was paid by Celtic for Phil O'Donnell. Much of this money was reinvested in the squad, while the club cycled through managers including Alex McLeish and Harri Kampman. At this point, in August 1998, John Boyle bought the club, taking over from John Chapman. Billy Davies was appointed as manager, and large transfer fees were paid for prominent players including ex-Scotland internationals John Spencer and Andy Goram. The investment though failed to provide results on the pitch.

2000–2009
By the end of Davies' tenure the club were in financial trouble. Eric Black was briefly in charge with the club floating near the foot of the table before it was placed in administration in April 2002 with losses approaching GBP 2 million yearly. Black resigned, and was replaced by Terry Butcher. The club's outlook remained bleak as they were forced to make redundant or release 19 players and replace them with younger players; Boyle also placed the club up for sale. Relegation in 2002–03 – normally automatic following a last-place finish in the league – was avoided on a technicality, as First Division winners Falkirk lacked a stadium meeting Premier League regulations.

Despite the lack of resources, a number of young talented players were found to play for the club; crucially, when many of these moved on, including Stephen Pearson and James McFadden, they brought revenue in the form of transfer fees, and with John Boyle waiving the club's personal debt to him, its financial future was assured by the conclusion of the 2004–05 season with the club's yearly losses falling to one of the lowest figures in the Premier League and the club coming out of administration in time to avoid a ten-point Premier League penalty which was being phased in for teams in administration. On the field, the club also managed to reach the League Cup final, although they were comprehensively defeated by Rangers. Butcher moved on to Sydney at the end of the 2005–06 season, and was succeeded by his assistant Maurice Malpas. Malpas' stint at the club lasted just one season before his resignation in May 2007. After a short period with Scott Leitch as caretaker manager, Mark McGhee was appointed to the position. In his first season as manager McGhee would take the club to 3rd in the league and thus qualify for the UEFA Cup for the first time in 13 years where they would be beaten by French side AS Nancy 3–0 on aggregate. Mark McGhee left Motherwell for the vacant managerial position at Aberdeen in June 2009 to be replaced by Jim Gannon. Former Scotland manager Craig Brown took over when Gannon left.

2010–present
Brown helped the club finish 5th in the SPL and qualify for Europe. The 2010–11 season saw the club in the Europa League and they defeated Breidablik and Aalesunds before losing in the Play-off round to Odense preventing them from reaching the group stages of the competition. Brown left Motherwell for Aberdeen on 10 December 2010. Stuart McCall was named as his successor. This season saw the club reach the Scottish Cup Final where they were defeated 3–0 by Celtic.

The 2011–12 season saw Motherwell reach the qualifying round of the Champions League for the first time. They finished third, one place outside the normal two spots allocated to the SPL for the Champions League. However the club was awarded a place because the club that had finished above them, Rangers, went into liquidation and were prevented by UEFA from playing in European competitions. In the draw for the 3rd qualification round of the Champions League Motherwell were drawn against Greek heavyweights Panathanaikos.  This ended in disappointment as Motherwell were knocked out after losing 2–0 at home and then 3–0 away.  The 2012–13 season brought even greater success in the SPL as the club finished 2nd in the table and once again qualified for the Europa League. It also saw striker Michael Higdon win the PFA Scotland Players' Player of the Year award. Goalkeeper Darren Randolph (second year running), defender Shaun Hutchinson and midfielder Nicky Law were selected for the PFA Scotland Team of the Year.

Motherwell were granted associate membership of the European Club Association in June 2013, becoming the fifth Scottish club to join the Association. The club were invited to join after consistent qualification for European competition between 2008 and 2013. In season 2013–14 Motherwell were knocked out of the Europa League by Russian side Kuban Krasnodar 3–0 on aggregate in the third qualifying round. On 22 January 2014 Motherwell won their 40th Lanarkshire cup beating Hamilton Academical 1–0 thanks to a 54th-minute goal by 19-year-old youngster Jack Leitch. On the final day of the 2013–14 Scottish Premiership, Motherwell won 1–0 at Aberdeen with a dramatic 93rd-minute winner, leapfrogging Aberdeen in the process to seal a second successive runners-up spot in the league. Despite conceding the most goals (60) out of the top six teams, European football was delivered for the sixth time in seven seasons, with a record points total (70). It was a season that also saw a first ever competitive defeat to Lanarkshire neighbours Albion Rovers, sitting third bottom of Scottish League Two at the time, 1–0 in the Scottish Cup.

Despite three successful consecutive league campaigns, Motherwell made a poor start to the 2014–15 Scottish Premiership, which ultimately led to the resignation of manager Stuart McCall on 2 November 2014. Despite the appointment of Ian Baraclough in December 2014, Motherwell were eventually consigned to a Scottish Premiership relegation play-off spot after a defeat at St Mirren in the penultimate league match of the 2014–15 season.
In the 2014–15 relegation play-off finals, Motherwell faced Rangers. The first leg, at Rangers' home ground, Ibrox Stadium, saw Motherwell run out as winners with a score of 1–3. In the second leg, Motherwell celebrated staying in the top division by winning, 3–0. On 23 September 2015, Motherwell parted ways with manager Ian Baraclough. Mark McGhee returned in October 2015 before being sacked in March 2017 after a poor run of results.

On 28 October 2016, Motherwell became a fan-owned club when supporters club Well Society's £1 deal with Les Hutchison was concluded. On 13 October 2017, Manager Stephen Robinson extended his contract until May 2020. On 31 December 2020, Robinson resigned as manager, with Keith Lasley taking interim charge.

In Popular Culture and Literature

In the crime novel The Greenock Murders by Kieran James (2021), a 10-year-old autistic boy, Wee Robbie, moves from Motherwell to Greenock with his family. He refuses to give up his support of Motherwell FC despite repeated abuse and bullying. In the closing stages of the novel, Motherwell beats Rangers 2–1 in a fictional 2022 Scottish Cup Final, involving real players' names on both sides.

Records and statistics

The club has won four major trophies in its history: the First Division in 1931–32, the Scottish Cup in 1952 and 1991, and the Scottish League Cup in 1950. In addition, it has won the second-tier Scottish league on four occasions; as the Second Division in 1953–54 and 1968–69, and as the First Division (beneath the Premier League) in 1981–82 and 1984–85. They also won the Milk Cup in 1983, and the Scottish Summer Cup in 1944 and 1965.

Bob Ferrier holds the record for the number of Motherwell appearances, with 626 in the inter-war period. The goalscoring record is held by Hughie Ferguson, who scored 284 league goals in 10 seasons in the 1910s and 1920s. Willie MacFadyen's 52 goals in the title-winning 1931–32 season remains a club (and country) record for goals in one season.

The club's record European appearance holder is Steven Hammell, with 19 appearances for the club in Europe. The current record European goalscorer is Jamie Murphy, with seven goals. Also, the 8–1 win over Flamurtari on 23 July 2009 currently stands as their record victory in European competition.

Its average home gate for the 2018–19 season was 5,448. The club's record attendance for a home match is 35,632, against Rangers in a Scottish Cup quarter-final replay on 12 March 1952, but as season ticket holders were not counted at the time, the true attendance would be over 37,000.

Motherwell's biggest win was a 12–1 victory over Dundee United in 1954, with the club's heaviest defeat being the 8–0 loss to Aberdeen in 1979.

On 5 May 2010, Motherwell were involved in the highest scoring match in the SPL, drawing 6–6 with Hibernian at Fir Park, with Lukas Jutkiewicz scoring the equaliser in the 91st minute. This eclipsed another high-scoring game involving Motherwell, a 6–5 defeat by Aberdeen on 20 October 1999.
The record transfer fee paid by the club was to Everton for John Spencer in 1999 (£500,000) and the highest received was David Turnbull for his move to Celtic in 2020 (£3.25m), eclipsing the 1.75m paid for previous record holder Phil O'Donnell in 1994. O'Donnell rejoined Motherwell in 2004, but his second spell at Fir Park ended when he died after collapsing on the pitch in a game against Dundee United on 29 December 2007.

Stephen Craigan holds the record for the most-capped player at the club, with 54 caps in total, 51 as a Motherwell player – Northern Ireland.

Europe

Player of the Year
The Supporters Association first handed out the award in April 1956. The first winner of the award was Andy Paton, who received a silver cup from Sailor Hunter at a dinner dance in Overton Miners Welfare. Paton was further honoured in 2007 when he was declared the "Greatest Ever" Motherwell player.

Joe Wark and Keith Lasley are the only men to win the award three separate times. Charlie Aitken was the first of five players to win the award back-to-back, with Louis Moult being the last player to do this.

1955–56 –  Andy Paton
1956–57 –  Charlie Aitken
1957–58 –  Charlie Aitken
1958–59 –  Ian St John
1959–60 –  Joe Mackin
1960–61 –  Pat Quinn
1961–62 –  Bobby Roberts
1962–63 –  Bobby McCallum
1963–64 –  Joe McBride
1964–65 –  Pat Delaney
1965–66 –  John Martis
1966–67 –  John Martis
1967–68 –  Peter McCloy
1968–69 –  Joe Wark
1969–70 –  Keith MacRae
1970–71 –  Bobby Watson
1971–72 –  Willie McCallum
1972–73 –  Joe Wark
1973–74 –  Bobby Graham
1974–75 –  Bobby Watson
1975–76 –  Joe Wark
1976–77 –  Stuart Rennie
1977–78 –  Gregor Stevens
1978–79 –  Stuart Rennie
1979–80 –  Hugh Sproat
1980–81 –  Joe Carson
1981–82 –  Steve McLelland
1982–83 –  Ally Mauchlen
1983–84 –  Andy Dornan
1984–85 –  Graham Forbes
1985–86 –  Tom Boyd
1986–87 –  Fraser Wishart
1987–88 –  Craig Paterson
1988–89 –  Stevie Kirk
1989–90 –  Tom Boyd
1990–91 –  Ally Maxwell
1991–92 –  Phil O'Donnell
1992–93 –  Sieb Dijkstra
1993–94 –  Brian Martin
1994–95 –  Brian Martin
1995–96 –  Paul Lambert
1996–97 –  Mitchell van der Gaag
1997–98 –  Tommy Coyne
1998–99 –  Ged Brannan
1999–00 –  Don Goodman
2000–01 –  Steven Hammell
2001–02 –  Éric Deloumeaux
2002–03 –  Martyn Corrigan
2003–04 –  Stephen Craigan
2004–05 –  Scott McDonald
2005–06 –  Graeme Smith
2006–07 –  Mark Reynolds
2007–08 –  David Clarkson
2008–09 –  Stephen Craigan
2009–10 –  John Ruddy
2010–11 –  Keith Lasley
2011–12 –  Keith Lasley
2012–13 –  Michael Higdon
2013–14 –  Keith Lasley
2014–15 –  Lee Erwin
2015–16 –  Louis Moult
2016–17 –  Louis Moult
2017–18 –  Trevor Carson
2018–19 –  David Turnbull
2019–20 –  Declan Gallagher
2020–21 –  Tony Watt
2021–22 –  Liam Kelly

Hall of Fame
The club launched its official Hall of Fame in 2019, with five inaugural members announced at a dinner on 23 November. Four of the names were confirmed prior to the event with a fifth, a special fans vote, announced on the night as Phil O’Donnell. The 2020 event was postponed due to the COVID-19 pandemic, with only three names, Hunter, Paton and Cooper having been confirmed. On 9 September 2021, the club announced the event was returning with the two remaining 2020 inductees to be named alongside the previous three, together with a whole new class of five names for 2021.

2019:
  George Stevenson
  Willie Pettigrew
  Ally Maxwell
  Phil O’Donnell
  James McFadden

2020:
  John 'Sailor' Hunter
  Andy Paton
  Joe Wark
  Davie Cooper
  Steven Hammell

2021:
  Bobby Ferrier
  John Martis
  Tommy McLean
  Steve Kirk
  Stephen Craigan

2022:
  Willie MacFadyen
  Willie Hunter
  Bobby Graham
  Tommy Coyne
  Keith Lasley

Managers

Honours

Motherwell have won a number of league titles and cups in their history, which includes six major domestic trophy successes. Their sole Scottish league championship came in season 1931–32 (66 points total, winning margin by 5 points). Amongst their biggest cup success was winning the Scottish Cup twice in 1951–52 (4–0 v Dundee) and 1990–91 (4–3 v Dundee United), and the Scottish League Cup once in 1950–51 (3–0 v Hibernian), also winning the now defunct Summer Cup in 1943–44 and 1964–65.

They have also won the second tier of Scottish league football on four occasions. Other notable cup success includes winning the Scottish Qualifying Cup once and winning the Lanarkshire Cup forty times.  Their most recent Final appearance in the Scottish Cup came in 2017–18 (2–0 defeat to Celtic) and the Scottish League Cup came in 2017–18 (2–0 defeat to Celtic). Their best league performance recently in the Scottish top flight was registering back-to-back second-place finishes in 2012–13 and 2013–14. They have qualified for European competition ten times.

The club won the Lanarkshire Cup during 2013–14 in the last season that the cup was competed. This was the club's fortieth success.

Below is a list of honours won and other achievements by Motherwell.

1The Scottish Football Federation was a short-lived non-league that Motherwell competed in from 1891 to 1893 before being elected into the Scottish Second Division in 1893–94.
2The Summer Cup in the 1940s was a regional competition for Southern League teams, while in the 1960s it was a national cup competition for Scottish League Division One clubs.
3The Lord Provost of Glasgow's Charity Cup was a Scottish Super Cup match between the 1951–52 Division One champions and 1951–52 Scottish Cup winners.
4The Lanarkshire Cup Final was between Motherwell and Airdieoanians in 1925–26, but the cup was withheld after a dispute over choice of venue.
5 The Franco-Scottish Friendship Cup was an Inter-League competition.

Current squad

First-team squad

On loan

Reserve team

Retired numbers

Since O'Donnell's death in 2007, only one player has worn the number 10 shirt. David Clarkson, who is the nephew of O'Donnell, wore the shirt up until he left the club in July 2009. While not officially retired, it has not been issued to any subsequent player.

Club staff

Board of Directors

Coaching staff

Sponsorship
Motherwell were sponsored in the 2019–20 season by online gambling company Paddy Power as part of their 'Save our Shirt' campaign'. This followed Bet Park sponsoring the side in a deal running since the start of the 2018–19 season. Commsworld was the principal sponsor from the 2010–11 season. Due to the sponsorship deal not being agreed in time for the start of the 2010–11 UEFA Europa League the team briefly featured www.chooselife.net as their main shirt sponsor. The team shirts continue to carry this sponsorship on the back of the shirt. Recently, they have also been sponsored by the local IT firm Log in to Learn, which have also appeared on the back of the shirts. For the 2009–10 season the team were sponsored by JAXX, a German gambling company. They in turn had replaced Anglian home improvements, who were the club's shirt sponsor from 2006 to 2008. Previous to this the club had been sponsored by Zoom Airlines, who were part-owned by club director John Boyle, and who retained advertising space on both the Davie Cooper Stand and the South Stand until they ceased trading in August 2008.

The sponsor from 2002 to 2004 was a local company called The Untouchables. Previously the club had enjoyed a long-term association with Motorola, but this ended after 11 years in 2002 as the sponsor started to reduce its manufacturing operations in Scotland. This had in turn followed another long-term association with local car dealer Ian Skelly, who had sponsored the club since 1984.

The club have had a number of different kit manufacturers since the 1970s. At present the official kit supplier is Macron who were newly announced for the 2014–15 season to replace Puma after their 3-year deal with the club expired. Previously the club kits were supplied by New-Zealand based sporting goods manufacturer Canterbury who were announced as the official kit supplier to Motherwell for the four years beginning with the 2009–10 season, taking over from Bukta. However, Canterbury went into administration after less than one year of the contract had been completed. Major manufacturers Adidas, Admiral, Hummel, Patrick, Pony, Umbro and Xara have all been kit providers for Motherwell.

Kit and main sponsors

References

Further reading

External links

 Official Motherwell Football Club Site

News and statistics
 motherWELLnet
 Motherwell FC NewsNow
 Motherwell FC BBC Sport
 Motherwell FC Sky Sports
 Motherwell FC ESPN
 Motherwell FC UEFA
 Motherwell FC Wishaw Press
 Motherwell FC Pie and Bovril
 Motherwell FC Soccerbase

 
Association football clubs established in 1886
Sport in Motherwell
Football clubs in Scotland
Scottish Premier League teams
1886 establishments in Scotland
Scottish Football League teams
Scottish Cup winners
Scottish Professional Football League teams
Scottish League Cup winners
Companies that have entered administration in the United Kingdom